The Church of Saint Michael is a Roman Catholic church in Osijek, Croatia. It is located in Tvrđa.

History 
Jesuits laid the foundation stone on 31 July 1725 on the foundation of Kasimpaša mosque, which was built during Ottoman period in Osijek.

In 1734 the first Mass was held in the unfinished church. In 1750 the church was dedicated to Saint Michael. It was finished in 1768.

In 1991, during the Croatian War of Independence the church was damaged, but in 1999 it was renovated.

Altars 

Church have 7 altars, which were added over time:

 Altar of Saint Michael (main altar)
 Altar of Saint John Nepomuk (from 1764)
 Altar of Saint Otilia (from 1768)
 Altar of Blessed Virgin Mary (also called White altar)
 Altar of Holy Cross (also called Black altar)
 Altar of Blessed Mary Assistant
 Altar of Saint Teresa of Ávila

References 

Roman Catholic churches completed in 1768
Buildings and structures in Osijek
1768 establishments in the Habsburg monarchy
Culture in Osijek
18th-century Roman Catholic church buildings in Croatia
Tourist attractions in Osijek